The Little River is a  tributary of the Salmon Falls River in the U.S. state of Maine. It rises from streams in York County, flows southwest through Lebanon, and reaches its confluence with the Salmon Falls River in Berwick.

See also
List of rivers of Maine

References

Maine Streamflow Data from the USGS
Maine Watershed Data From Environmental Protection Agency

Rivers of York County, Maine
Berwick, Maine
Rivers of Maine